The Institut québécois de planification financière (IQPF) is a not-for-profit organization that awards the Financial Planner (F.Pl.) diploma in Quebec (Canada) and administers the Autorité des marchés financiers (AMF)'s regulation relating to the professional continuous training of its graduates.

In addition, the IQPF develops and delivers professional development activities for financial planners. Financial planners must accumulate professional development units in three categories:
 Integrated personal financial planning (IPFP)
 Training activities in one or more of the financial planning areas (SFPA)
 Training activities in subjects pertaining to compliance with standards, ethics and business conduct (SC), and training activities in subjects pertaining to compliance with standards, ethics and business conduct related directly to financial planning (SC-FP)

Regulation of Financial Planners
In Quebec, under the article 57 of the "Loi sur la distribution des produits et services financiers" (Act respecting the distribution of financial products and services), only a person holding a diploma in financial planning issued by the Institut québécois de planification financière may obtain, from the Autorité des marchés financiers (Quebec) (AMF), a certificate authorizing the person to use the title of financial planner.

The Chambre de la sécurité financière (CSF) is responsible for financial planners' ethical obligations since 1998. Financial planners that are members of the Ordre des comptables professionnels agréés du Québec and the Ordre des Administrateurs Agréés du Québec fall under their professional order's regulation, according to an agreement with the AMF.

Mission 
The mission of the IQPF is to protect the personal finances of the public by training financial planners and establishing standards of professional practice.

Professional practice model 

The professional practice model for financial planners developed under the IQPF is based on an integrated personal financial planning approach. This approach brings together skills from seven areas of intervention: estates, finance, insurance and risk management, investment, legal aspects, retirement and taxation. The training activities and reference materials help participants develop their expertise, as well as provide their clients with advice and recommendations.

Awards and Distinctions 
Honorary members

Since 2007, the IQPF has awarded honorary membership annually to financial planners who have distinguished themselves in a variety of ways, including providing exceptional services to the IQPF, the financial planning profession or the community. These recipients are:
2007 - Jean-Guy Grenier 

2007 - Guy Jasmin 

2008 - Henri Gagnon 

2009 - Daniel Laverdière 

2010 - Robert McLaughlin 

2011 - Thérèse Quirion 

2012 - Gilles Garon

2013 - Natalie Hotte

2014 - Fabien Champagne 

2015 - Michel Lavoie 

2016 - Pierre Larose

2017 - Sylvain Chartier

2018 - Denis Preston

2020 - Nancy Paquet

2020 - Dany Provost

In addition, the presidents of the IQPF are appointed honorary members.

Instructors of the Year

Since 2008, the IQPF has awarded the title of "Instructor of the Year in Professional Development" (PD) and "Instructor of the Year in Professional Training" (PT) annually to recognize the excellence of the instructors' work. Recipients of these awards:

2008 - Martine Berthelet (PD) and Pierre Larose (PT)

2009 - Annie Boivin (PD) and Martine Berthelet (PT)

2010 - Robert McLaughlin (PD) and Marthine Berthelet (PT)

2011 - Daniel T. Jolin (PD) and Jean Turcotte (PT)

2012 - Caroline Marion (PD) and Martine Berthelet (PT)

2013 - Denis Preston (PD) and Martine Berthelet (PT)

2014 - Caroline Marion and Denis Preston (PD) and Nancy D'Amours (PT)

2015 - Caroline Marion and Denis Preston (PD) and Nancy D'Amours (PT)

2016 - Martin Dupras and Caroline Marion (PD) and Jean Turcotte (PT)

2017 - Sylvain Houde (PD) and Martin Dupras (PT)

2018 - Denis Preston (PD) and Nancy D'Amours (PT)

2019 - Caroline Marion (PD) and Felice Torre (PT)

Prix de journalisme en littératie financière

Since 2012, the IQPF awards a "Prix de journalisme en littératie financière" to a journalist in Québec who contributes, by their actions, their implication and their outreach, to the financial education of Quebecers and by so doing, to the influence of financial planning. The winners:

2012 – Stéphanie Grammond

2013 – Gérald Fillion

2014 – René Vézina

2015 – Marc Tison

2016 – Pierre-Yves McSween

2017 – François Gagnon

2018 - Daniel Germain

History of the Institute 
 1989 - The passing of the Act respecting market intermediaries, providing for the creation of a "Institut québécois de planification financière". The IQPF was created in 1989 under the 3rd part of the Quebec Companies Act, following the coming into force of the Act respecting market intermediaries (RSQ c. I-15.1), passed on June 21, 1989 by the National Assembly of Quebec:

"The Minister shall, before granting his accreditation to a Québec institute of financial planners, obtain the advice of the Inspector General.

The accredited institute shall, by a by-law subject to the approval of the Government, determine the conditions governing the issuance of financial planner's diplomas, including those relating to equivalence, and the terms and conditions of payment of the contributions to be paid by the persons who use the title of financial planner."

 1992 - The IQPF holds its first official graduation ceremony.
 1996 - The first "Certificate in personal financial planning" program begins in the autumn of 1996 at the University of Laval with 850 registrations. Today, a dozen or so institutions offer a program in personal financial planning approved by the IQPF.
 1996 - Publication of the first edition of "La Collection de l'IQPF", the reference work for financial planners.
 1997 - The IQPF develops the Competency profile of financial planners, which aims to define the financial planner's role, as well as the professional skills essential to the practice of financial planning.
 1998- The passing of the Act respecting the distribution of financial products and services (bill 188), which recognizes the IQPF as the exclusive authority in granting the financial planner diploma and establishing the rules concerning the ongoing professional development of professional financial planners. Bill 188 comes into force in 1999.
 1998- IQPF partners up with five other organizations to hold the first Financial Planning Week. This annual event turned into the Mois de la planification financière de la retraite, organized by Question Retraite.
 1999 - Professional development becomes mandatory for financial planners.
 1999 - The IQPF amends its regulation on the basic education of financial planners to make the bachelor's degree (or equivalent training) the standard for obtaining the financial planner diploma. This minimum standard came into force in 2002 for new registrants and in 2005 for those who were already enrolled in the training program leading to the title.
 2001 - Approval by decree of the new regulation on the compulsory professional development of financial planners, which is administered by the IQPF.
 December 2002 - The Act respecting the "Agence nationale d'encadrement du secteur financier", which became the Act respecting the "Autorité des marchés financiers" (AMF) in 2004, recognizes the IQPF as the only organization authorized to grant the financial planning diploma in Quebec. The IQPF determines the diploma requirements as well as those for academic equivalency. The AMF must consult with the IQPF on all matters relating to financial planning. The IQPF reports to the AMF when it comes to financial planners' compliance with professional development requirements.
 2004 - First edition of the "Professional Standards in Financial Planning" including Ethical Standards.
 2004 - The IQPF files a formal application with the Office des professions du Québec (OPQ) requesting the creation of a professional order of financial planners.
 2005 - The bachelor's degree is required to obtain the IQPF diploma.
 2007 - Entry into force of the new Regulation respecting the compulsory professional development of financial planners, which is administered by the IQPF.
 2007 - The OPQ launches a public consultation on the IQPF's request to establish a professional order of financial planners. 238 individuals and 27 ministries, organizations, professional associations and financial institutions responded to this consultation. Individual respondents are overwhelmingly in favor of the creation of a new order. 
 2008 - After a long study by the Advisory Committee, the Office des professions du Québec does not recommend the establishment of a professional order of financial planners, arguing that the current regulation framework is sufficient. Despite this outcome, the IQPF continues to this day to call for the creation of a professional order of financial planners.
 2008 - Launch of the Solution IQPF, online tool which includes "La Collection de l'IQPF", "Professional Standards", the "La Cible" magazine and hyperlinks to legal documents. 2008 - Launch of the "Projection Assumption Guidelines".
 2010 - The IQPF grants the "Affiliated to the IQPF" status to all accredited financial planners in Québec. 
 June 2010 - The IQPF becomes the 7th member organization of the Financial Planning Standards Council (FPSC).
 May 2011- The IQPF and four other organizations join together to form the "Coalition for Professional Standards for Financial Planners", now called the "Financial Planning Coalition". The mandate of the Coalition is to lay the foundations for the profession of financial planner in Canada and to promote the formal recognition of financial planning as a distinct profession. The Coalition currently consists of four organizations: the Canadian Institute of Financial Planners (CIFPs), the Financial Planning Standards Council (FPSC), the Institute of Advanced Financial Planners (IAFP) and the "Institut québécois de planification financière" (IQPF).
2011 - The IQPF and the FPSC agree on a common set of principles within their respective Codes of Ethics.
December 1, 2011 - Entry into force of the AMF's new regulation respecting the compulsory professional development of financial planners, which is administered by the IQPF.
 2012 - Reciprocal agreement with the Association française des Conseils en gestion de patrimoine certifiés (CGPC).
 2015 - Publication of the guide entitled "Financial Planning in Canada: Definitions, Standards and Competencies" by the IQPF and the FPSC. 
 2015 - The FPSC joins the IQPF in publishing the "Projection Assumption Guidelines", which become Canada-wide guidelines.

List of IQPF Presidents:
Charles Pelletier (1989-1992), Jocelyne Gagnon (1992-1993), Jean-Claude Lefebvre (1993-1994), Robert Lafond (1994-1995), Michel Mailloux (1995-1996 et 2000-2002), Paul Turcot (1996-1997), Anne-Marie Girard-Plouffe (1997-1998), Réjean Ross (1998-1999), Denis Boucher (1999-2000), Richard Pilotte (2002-2004), Jean Girard (2004-2005), André Buteau (2005-2006), Gilles Sinclair (2006-2008), Robin W. De Celles (2008-2010), Martin Dupras (2010-2012), Yves L. Giroux (2012-2014), Nathalie Bachand (2014-2016), Sylvain B. Tremblay (2016-2018), Julie Raîche (2018-2020), Daniel Lanteigne (2020-).

Notes and references

See also

Personal finance
Non-profit organizations based in Quebec
Educational organizations based in Quebec
1989 establishments in Quebec
Organizations established in 1989